Thessalus is a name that may refer to:

Thessalus, the name of several figures in Greek mythology
Thessalus (physician), Greek physician (5th - 4th centuries BCE) 
Thessalus of Tralles, Roman physician (1st century CE)
Thessalus (actor), a tragic actor in the times of Alexander the Great 
This Thessalus appears as a character in Steven Pressfield's The Virtues of War